Rupert Michael Fiennes Cox (born 20 August 1967 in Guildford, Surrey) is a former English cricketer. Cox was a left-handed batsman and a right-arm off break bowler.

Cox signed for Hampshire in 1990, making his first-class debut against Sussex and his List-A debut against Worcestershire. In his second first-class match Cox made his maiden and only first-class century, scoring 104* against Worcestershire. Cox played infrequently during five seasons with the club, with his final first-class match coming against the touring South Africans in 1994. After the 1994 County Championship season Cox was released after failing to make his mark in either form of the game for the club.

External links
Rupert Cox on Cricinfo
Rupert Cox on CricketArchive
Matches and detailed statistics for Rupert Cox

1967 births
Living people
Sportspeople from Guildford
People from Surrey
English cricketers
Hampshire cricketers